William Charles Wolford (born May 18, 1964) is a former American football offensive lineman in the National Football League (NFL) for the Buffalo Bills, the Indianapolis Colts, and the Pittsburgh Steelers.

Playing career
Wolford attended St. Xavier High School in Louisville, Kentucky and played college football at Vanderbilt University.  He was the Bills' first-round pick in the 1986 NFL Draft, and played for them from 1986 to 1992, including AFC championships (and Super Bowl losses) in his last three years in Buffalo.  Wolford signed as a free agent with the Colts in 1993, and finally joined the Steelers from 1996 to 1998.  He was named to the AFC Pro Bowl roster in 1990, 1992, and 1995.

Post-playing career
In 2002, he became the majority owner/operator of the Arena Football 2 Louisville Fire.

Wolford took over color analyst duties for the Colts in the 2007 season, working alongside longtime Colts voice Bob Lamey.  Wolford was also co-host of The Bob and Will Show, working alongside Bob Valvano on WQKC, an all-sports station in Louisville, until that station changed formats in November 2008.

In 2013, Wolford became the head football coach at his alma mater of St. Xavier High, replacing the retiring Mike Glaser.  On December 20, 2017, he announced his retirement.

Personal life
Wolford's wife, Mary Jude Wolford, is a career lawyer who was elected Nov. 8, 2022, to be the 15th Division District Court Judge in Kentucky. She had been a former assistant district attorney in Jefferson County. She and Wolford have been married since 1992. They have three adult daughters.

Wolford's nephew, John Wolford, is a quarterback for the Los Angeles Rams and played for the Arizona Hotshots in the Alliance of American Football.

References

External links
 

1964 births
Living people
American Conference Pro Bowl players
American football executives
American football offensive tackles
Buffalo Bills players
High school football coaches in Kentucky
Indianapolis Colts players
National Football League announcers
Pittsburgh Steelers players
Sportspeople from Louisville, Kentucky
St. Xavier High School (Louisville) alumni
Vanderbilt Commodores football players
Players of American football from Louisville, Kentucky